is a Japanese biathlete. He competed at the 1988 Winter Olympics, the 1992 Winter Olympics and the 1994 Winter Olympics.

References

1961 births
Living people
Japanese male biathletes
Olympic biathletes of Japan
Biathletes at the 1988 Winter Olympics
Biathletes at the 1992 Winter Olympics
Biathletes at the 1994 Winter Olympics
Sportspeople from Iwate Prefecture
Asian Games medalists in biathlon
Biathletes at the 1990 Asian Winter Games
Asian Games gold medalists for Japan
Asian Games silver medalists for Japan
Medalists at the 1990 Asian Winter Games
20th-century Japanese people